The third season of the animated television series Aqua Teen Hunger Force originally aired in the United States on Cartoon Network's late-night programming block Adult Swim. Season three started on April 25, 2004 with "Video Ouija" and ended with "Carl" on October 24, 2004, with a total of thirteen episodes. Aqua Teen Hunger Force is about the surreal adventures and antics of three anthropomorphic fast food items: Master Shake, Frylock, and Meatwad, who live together as roommates and frequently interact with their human next-door neighbor, Carl Brutananadilewski in a suburban neighborhood in South New Jersey. In May 2015, this season became available on Hulu Plus.

In season three the cold openings featuring Dr. Weird and Steve were replaced with clips from the failed pilot Spacecataz, a potential spin-off of Aqua Teen Hunger Force. Episodes in season three were written and directed by Dave Willis and Matt Maiellaro. Almost every episode in this season features a special guest appearance, which continues a practice used in past seasons. This season has been made available on DVD and other forms of home media, including on demand streaming.

Production
Every episode in this season was written and directed by series creators Dave Willis and Matt Maiellaro, who have both written and directed every episode of the series. All episodes originally aired in the United States on Cartoon Network's late night programming block, Adult Swim. This season was one of the original seasons branded under the Aqua Teen Hunger Force title before Willis and Maiellaro started using a different alternative title for each season in 2011. As with most seasons, several episodes originally aired outside of their production order.

In season three the cold openings featuring Dr. Weird and Steve are replaced with clips from the pilot episode of Spacecataz. Spacecataz is a failed pilot for a potential Aqua Teen Hunger Force spin-off, surrounding a feud amongst The Mooninites and The Plutonians, which was never aired on television. The length of each clip was determined by the length of the episode. The cold opens were discontinued entirely beginning in the fourth season, with the one time exception of the season eight episode "Allen Part One", making season three the final season to feature consistent cold openings.

Cast

In season three the main cast consisted of Dana Snyder who provided the voice of Master Shake, Carey Means who provided the voice of Frylock, and series co-creator Dave Willis who provided the voice of both Meatwad and Carl Brutananadilewski; and recurring character Ignignokt. Season three also features recurring voices from Matt Maiellaro who voiced Err, George Lowe who voiced himself as various characters, MC Chris who voiced MC Pee Pants, Andy Merrill who voiced Oglethorpe and Merle, and Mike Schatz who voiced Emory.

Season three also featured many guest appearances. In "Remooned" Nick Ingkatanuwat voiced Cliff and Vishal Roney voiced Foodie-Mart clerk. Ted Nugent voiced himself in "Gee Whiz". Robobsitter was voiced by comedian Sarah Silverman in "Robositter". Dusty Gozongas was voiced by Scott Thompson in "Dusty Gozongas". Akhenaton Nickens made a cameo as a giant unnamed larva at the end of "Diet". In "Hypno-Germ" Janeane Garofalo (credited as Beverly Center) provided the voice of Donna and Bob Odenkirk (credited as "Vance Hammersly") voiced Bean Wizard. "Hypno-Germ" also features now-Adult Swim veterans Tim Heidecker, and Eric Wareheim of the comedy duo Tim & Eric; Heidecker voiced the basketball and Wareheim voiced Germ King.

Episodes

Home release

The entire third season was released on the Aqua Teen Hunger Force Volume Four DVD on December 6, 2005. The set was released by Adult Swim and distributed by Warner Home Video, and features multiple special features including the failed pilot of Spacecataz and commentaries on select episodes. The first disc features a gag where selecting 'Play All' on the menu screen literally causes all of the episodes on the two DVDs to play on the screen simultaneously. The second disc features a 'Play None' option. Selecting this option causes the screen to go black for an indefinite amount of time. The set was later released in Region 4 by Madman Entertainment on February 4, 2009. The set was released in Region 2 on July 5, 2010.

This season was also released under the label "Season 4" on iTunes, the Xbox Live Marketplace, and Amazon Video under the label "Volume Four".

See also
 List of Aqua Teen Hunger Force episodes
 Aqua Teen Hunger Force

References

External links

 Aqua Teen Hunger Force at Adult Swim
 Aqua Teen Hunger Force season 3 at the Internet Movie Database

2004 American television seasons
Aqua Teen Hunger Force seasons